Buhari Syed Abdur Rahman (15 October 1927 – 7 January 2015) was an Indian entrepreneur, philanthropist and educationist. He had a range of business interests in the UAE and India (in Tamil Nadu) including maritime shipping, real estate, insurance etc. He founded numerous schools, colleges, hospitals and university. He was one of the 24 Indians to feature in The 500 Most Influential Muslims, an annual publication which ranks the most influential Muslims in the world.

Abdur Rahman was the Vice-Chairperson of Emirates Trading Agency (commonly known as ETA Star) and Ascon Group, a Dubai-based conglomerate from 1973 to 2015. He is the founder of B. S. Abdur Rahman University (earlier named Crescent Engineering College), one of the first private owned engineering colleges in Chennai. He was the Chairman of East Coast Constructions and Industries, West Asia Exports and Imports, West Asia Maritime, Buhari Group, Amana Investments in Hong Kong and Transcar India. He was also the Vice-Chairman of Coal & Oil and Coastal Energy. He founded India's first stand-alone health insurer Star Health and Allied Insurance with the help of Oman Insurance Company.

East Coast Constructions and Industries, founded in 1962, built several landmarks in Chennai including Gemini Flyover, Kodambakkam Flyover, Chepauk Stadium, Chennai Citi Centre, Government General Hospital, Valluvar Kottam, the Marina Lighthouse, Apollo Hospital complex (Greams Road) and the Omandurar hospital. He died on 7 January 2015 at the age of 87.

Abdur Rahman pursued a number of philanthropic endeavors, donating large amounts of money to various charitable organisations and concentrates on upliftment of economically weaker sections through the Seethakathi Trust & Zakaat Fund Foundation.

Early life 
B. S. Abdur Rahman was born in Kilakarai, Tamil Nadu, India, in a middle-class Marakkar family, the son of Bhukari Aalim. His father was a prominent Pearl Trader in South Asia. He completed his Secondary School Level at Schwartz School, Ramanathapuram & Hameedia High School, Kilakarai. He was blessed with four sons and two daughters. He started his business in Sri Lanka with his elder brother Abdul Kader prominently called Thaika Vapa in Tamil Nadu. He had a sister and after her accidental death B.S. Abdul Rahman started a Women's College in his sister's name Thassim Beevi Abdul Kader College for Women in his home town. He has started so many schools and colleges in Tamil Nadu.

Business career 
At the age of fifteen, Abdur Rahman first went to Colombo with just 149. He worked as an errand boy for diamond merchants. He was at the time staying at rent-free accommodation with traders from Kilakarai but he had to fetch tea for them from a nearby hotel, clean the rooms and perform other menial tasks.

A lesser person perhaps would have thrown in the towel. But Sena Aana was made of sterner stuff. Before long, he used his persuasive skills to obtain gemstones on credit from another merchant and began trading in them. In time he became a successful gem trader. The base that Abdur Rahman built in Ceylon was to help him in all his future activities.

He began visiting Belgium, then as now, a centre of the gem trade, the USA, South America and set up business in Penang, Malaysia, Madras (now Chennai), Kolkata (then Calcutta), and then in Hong Kong. It was in Hong Kong that his business flourished. Incidentally, Abdur Rahman was the first person from Kilakarai to go to Hong Kong.

In Hong Kong he launched the Precious Trading Company in 1954. Later, his very special brainchild, the Amana Group of Hong Kong, was established. It was under its banner that the multi-national company ETA-Ascon came into existence. BSA Rahman is credited as production facilitator in MGR Pictures' Ulagam Sutrum Valiban for film shoot in Hong Kong.

ETA Group was started in Dubai in 1973 as a partnership with a friend, Abdullah Al-Ghurair, Chairman of the Al Ghurair Group of companies. The global asset bubble triggered by Nixon Shock catapulted him into a rupee billionaire in the 1970s; and diversification made him a dollar billionaire by the 1990s. Originally a civil construction contractor, ETA-Ascon expanded into trading, elevator and electrical installations, real estate, mechanical engineering, building maintenance, car dealerships, and, most recently, shipping and aviation. It employs over 54,000 people across 16 industry verticals. ETA-Ascon is today the flagship of BSA Rahman's vast industrial empire.

Contribution in education 
Abdur Rahman felt that education is the key that opens the solutions to the socio-economic problems of the society. Hence he founded the following institutions through which all his educational and literacy activities are carried out.

 The Seethakathi Trust
 All India Islamic Foundation
 B.S. Abdur Rahman University
 Thassim Beevi Abdul Kader College for Women
 Islamic Studies & Cultural Centre
 B.S. Abdur Rahman Zakat Foundation Trust

Board memberships 
Apart from ETA, Abdur Rahman held the following positions in other companies :

Chairman, Buhari Holding (P) Ltd., Chennai
Chairman, ABR Enterprises (P) Ltd., Chennai
Chairman, West Asia Maritime Ltd., Chennai 
Chairman, West Asia Exports & Imports Pvt Ltd., Chennai
Chairman, East Coast Constructions & Industries (P) Ltd., Chennai
Chairman, Sethu Investments Pvt Ltd., Chennai

Philanthropy

Youth welfare activities 
Abdur Rahman felt that a sound mind in a sound body is a healthy trend of development of the youth in this country. Hence much importance is being given to NSS, NCC, Scouts and other youth activities in all his institutions. Hence to promote sports activities and to imbibe sports culture in the minds of youngsters, he constructed and donated a stadium with all facilities for indoor games, gymnasium and a gallery to Tamil Nadu Govt. under the purview of Sports Authority of Tamil Nadu during 1997. The stadium was inaugurated by Anbazhagan, Minister of Education, in the presence of Dhanushkodi Athithan, Minister of State.

Economical support works 
Abdur Rahman was the founder of United Economic Forum through which he organized a number of economic development activities and encouraged social work.

Orphanages 
Abdur Rahman has founded and financially aided the following orphanages :

 Al-Mumin Seethakathi Children Home, Sakkaraikottai, Ramanathapuram District
 Al-Mumin Umar Pulavar Children Hoome, Ottapidaram, V.O.C. District
 Al-Mumin Shahul Hameed (Wali) Children Home, Thanjavur, Thanjavur District
 Al-Mumin K.T.M.S. Hamid Children Home (Girls), Kilakarai, Ramnad District
 Al-Mumin Malik Dinar Children Home (Girls), Thiruvithancode

Awards and honours 
In recognition of his services in the field of education, business, health care, social service and communal harmony, the Sathyabama University has conferred an Honorary Doctorate on him in 2005.

Gallery

See also 
Kilakarai
Tamil Muslim
ETA Star Group
Crescent Engineering College

References

External links 
 ETA Ascon Star Group
 Thassim Beevi Abdul Kader College for Women
 Crescent Matriculation Higher Secondary School for Girls
 Crescent Matriculation Higher Secondary School
 B.S.Abdur Rahman Zakaat Fund Foundation
 Kilakarai Bukhari Aalim Arabic College
 B.S. Abdur Rahman
 ABR Enterprises
 Buhari Holding
 Profile of B.S. Abdur Rahman
 B.S. Abdur Rahman University
 India Islamic Culture Centre
 Seethakathi Of The 20th Century
 Kayalpatnam Medical Trust Hospital
 East Coast Construction Industries Limited
 BSA Book Release Function Video
 Buhari Holdings Private Limited
 West Asia Maritime Ltd
 Coal & Oil LLC

Indian industrialists
Tamil businesspeople
Businesspeople from Tamil Nadu
Tamil billionaires
1927 births
2015 deaths
Indian billionaires
Indian expatriates in Sri Lanka
Indian expatriates in Hong Kong